Ihor Sahach (born 19 May 1956, Kiev, Ukrainian SSR, Soviet Union) is a Ukrainian diplomat. Ambassador Extraordinary and Plenipotentiary of Ukraine.

Education 
Ihor Sahach graduated from Taras Shevchenko National University of Kyiv in 1978.

Career 
In 1978-1981 - he was specialist Counsellor for Economic Affairs of the Soviet Embassy in Ethiopia.

In 1982-1987 - he was junior researcher, senior laboratory Kiev Trade and Economic Institute.

In 1987-1993 - he was the 3rd secretary, 2nd secretary, 1st secretary of the Ministry of Foreign Affairs of Ukraine.

In 1993-1994 - Head of Department of Nordic and Baltic Ministry of Foreign Affairs of Ukraine.

From May 1994 to July 1997 - Charge d'Affaires of Ukraine in the Kingdom of Sweden, Counsellor of the Embassy of Ukraine in Finland.

In 1997-1998 - Deputy Head of European and transatlantic integration of the Ministry of Foreign Affairs of Ukraine.

In 1998-2001 - Deputy Chairman of the Foundation for Local Self-Government of Ukraine on international issues.

From 2001 - he was head of the United Nations and other International Organizations, Ministry of Foreign Affairs of Ukraine.

25 August 2004 - 15 January 2008 - Ambassador Extraordinary and Plenipotentiary of Ukraine in Norway.

On 15 January 2008 - 12 May 2010 - he was head of Mission of Ukraine to NATO.

On 19 March 2015 he was appointed ambassador of Ukraine in the Kingdom of Sweden.

References

External links
 Ukraine's mission to NATO headed by Ihor Sahach
 Ukraine’s envoy to NATO proposes Russian counterpart to focus on his problems
 Ukraine's Euro-Atlantic Future: International Forum III
 Ukraine and NATO discuss practical progress in implementing Ukraine's Euro-Atlantic aspirations
 Ukrainian and European politicians and experts discuss current trends in the development of national gender equality mechanisms
 Ukraine Signs NATO Declaration
 Ukrainians, Norwegians sign off on new visa regime agreements

Living people
1956 births
Ambassadors of Ukraine to Norway
Ambassadors of Ukraine to Sweden
Ukrainian politicians
Heads of mission of Ukraine to NATO